Jänicke is a surname. Notable people with the surname include:

 Britta Jänicke (born 1958), German paralympic athlete
 Gerlinde Jänicke (born 1973), German host and announcer
 Tobias Jänicke (born 1989), German footballer

See also
 Janick

German-language surnames